The ju-jitsu competition at the 2022 World Games took place in July 2022, in Birmingham in United States, at the Birmingham Southern College.
Originally scheduled to take place in July 2021, the Games were rescheduled for July 2022 as a result of the 2020 Summer Olympics postponement due to the COVID-19 pandemic.

Qualification

Medal table

Medalists

Fighting

Ne-waza

Team

References

External links
 The World Games 2022
 Ju-jitsu International Federation
 Results book

 
2022 World Games